Padma Bahadur Khatri (19 July 1915 – 1985) was a  foreign minister of Nepal, and also served as an army officer and diplomat.

He began his career as a soldier, and eventually attained the rank of Major General. He delivered Nepal's first application for membership of the United Nations in 1948, which was eventually accepted in 1955. He served as Nepal's Permanent Representative to the United Nations, from 1964 until at least 1971, and was twice the President of the Security Council when Nepal was a member of the Council in the 1970s.

In 1962 he was chairman of the Nepal-China Boundary Commission that successfully demarcated the Nepalese-Tibetan border. He served twice as the Nepali Ambassador to the United States in the 1960s and 1970s. In 1982, he was appointed as Foreign Minister by the King of Nepal.

At the time of his death, he was a member of the National Assembly of Nepal.

References

Permanent Representatives of Nepal to the United Nations
1915 births
1985 deaths
Foreign Ministers of Nepal